The Noyes-Parris House is a historic First Period house located in Wayland, Massachusetts.

Description and history 
The oldest portion of this house is a "single cell", three bays wide and two stories high, with what is now the central chimney of the house. It was built c. 1669, and extended to its present size, five bays wide, c. 1790. Peter Noyes, the builder, was one of Wayland's early settlers; his daughter, Dorothy, became the second wife of Rev. Samuel Parris, a major figure in the Salem witch trials.

The house was listed on the National Register of Historic Places on March 9, 1990.

See also
Hopestill Bent Tavern, 252 Old Connecticut Path, also a First Period building
National Register of Historic Places listings in Middlesex County, Massachusetts

Setting for the film "The Inhabitants" 2015

References

Houses completed in 1690
Houses on the National Register of Historic Places in Middlesex County, Massachusetts
Buildings and structures in Wayland, Massachusetts
1690 establishments in Massachusetts